The principal Sikh scripture is the Adi Granth (First Scripture), more commonly called the Guru Granth Sahib. The second most important scripture of the Sikhs is the Dasam Granth. Both of these consist of text which was written or authorised by the Sikh Gurus.

Within Sikhism the Guru Granth Sahib or Adi Sri Granth Sahib is more than just a scripture. Sikhs consider this Granth (holy book) to be a living Guru. The holy text spans 1430 pages and contains the actual words spoken by the founders of the Sikh religion (the Ten Gurus of Sikhism) and the words of various other Saints from other religions including Hinduism and Islam.

The term used to label the language employed by the Sikh gurus in their compositions is Sant Bhasha, a composite literary language of North India that borrows vocabulary from a variety of regional and historical lects.

Shaant Ras (Essence of Peace)

Guru Granth Sahib 

The principal Sikh scripture is the Adi Granth (First Scripture), more commonly called the Guru Granth Sahib. The Sikhs do not regard this as their "holy book" but as their perpetual and current "guru", guide or master. It was called Adi Granth until Guru Gobind Singh, the tenth and final guru in human form, conferred on it the title of the guru in 1708, after which it was called Sri Guru Granth Sahib, or Guru Granth Sahib for short. The Granth has 1430 Ang Sahib (ang meaning limb since the Guru Granth Sahib is not a book but it is the eternal Guru for Sikhs) divided into 39 chapters. All copies are exactly alike. The Sikhs are forbidden from making any changes to the text within this scripture.

The Guru Granth Sahib was compiled by Guru Arjan Dev, the fifth guru of the Sikhs. The work of compilation was started in 1601 and finished in 1604. The Granth, called "Pothi Sahib" by Guru Arjan, was installed at Harmandir Sahib (House of God) with much celebration. The SGPC Guru Granth Sahib has the works of 6 Gurus while the Nihang version has the works of 7 gurus including one couplet by Guru Har Rai.

Japji Sahib 

Japji Sahib is a Sikh prayer, that appears at the beginning of the Guru Granth Sahib – the scripture and the eternal guru of the Sikhs. It was composed by Guru Nanak, the founder of Sikhism. It begins with Mool Mantra and then follow 38 paudis (stanzas) and completed with a final Salok by Guru Angad at the end of this composition. The 38 stanzas are in different poetic meters.

Japji Sahib is the first composition of Guru Nanak, and is considered the comprehensive essence of Sikhism. Expansion and elaboration of Japji Sahib is the entire Guru Granth Sahib. It is first Bani in Nitnem. Notable is Guru Nanak's discourse on 'what is true worship' and what is the nature of God'. According to Christopher Shackle, it is designed for "individual meditative recitation" and as the first item of daily devotional prayer for the devout. It is a chant found in the morning and evening prayers in Sikh gurdwaras. It is also chanted in the Sikh tradition at the Khalsa initiation ceremony and during the cremation ceremony.

Bhai Gurdas Varan

Varan Bhai Gurdas is the name given to the 40 varan (chapters) of writing by Bhai Gurdas. They have been referred to as the "Key to the Guru Granth Sahib" by Guru Arjan Dev, the fifth Sikh guru. He was the first scribe of Guru Granth Sahib and a scholar of great repute. From his work, it is clear that he had mastery of various Indian languages and had studied many ancient Indian religious scriptures.

Languages 

The following languages are found in this Granth:
  Punjabi – many Sikh Gurus, Bhagat (saint) Sheikh Farid and others
  Sindhi – Guru Arjan
  Sanskrit – Guru Nanak, Guru Arjan and others
  Gujarati and Marathi – Bhagat Namdev and Trilochan
  Western Hindi – Bhagat Kabir
  Eastern Hindi – Court poets
  Eastern Apabhramshas – Bhagat Jaidev
  Persian and Arabic – Bhagat Namdev and Guru Nanak

The first published translation of the Guru Granth Sahib into Sindhi was done in 1959 by Jethanand B. Lalwani of Bharat Jivan Publications.  He used his entire personal savings and produced 500 copies. Lalwani later took out loans to make a reprint in 1963.

The knowledge that enshrines and illuminates Guru Granth Sahib does not recommend translation; instead a direct learning connection with Guru Granth Sahib is only advised. This recommendation reduces learner's bias through secondary translations and middle channels that could mislead a learners' journey.

Bir Ras (Essence of War)

Dasam Granth 

This is regarded as the second holiest book of the Sikhs and is called the Dasam Granth – the book of the tenth guru. The Granth was compiled three years after the guru's death and it was Mata Sundri, the widow of the guru, who asked Bhai Mani Singh, a contemporary of the guru, to collect all the hymns composed by the guru and prepare a Granth of the Guru. However, the narrative of Bhai Mani Singh being the collector and compiler of Guru Gobind Singh's writings is strongly based on a letter purported to be Bhai Mani Singh writing to Mata Sundari. The authenticity of this letter has been challenged by scholars like Rattan Singh Jaggi, who claim the writing style does not match Bhai Mani Singh's time period and the letter only surfaced in the 1920's. It was completed in 1711. In its present form it contains 1428 pages and 16 chapters as listed below. The Nihang Dasam Granth contains 70 chapters.
 Jaap (meditation)
 Bichitra Natak (autobiography of the Guru)
 Akal Ustat (praises of God)
 Chandi Charitar I & II (the character of goddess Chandi)
 Chandi di Var (a ballad to describe goddess Durga)
 Gian Prabodh (the awakening of knowledge)
 Chaubis Avtar (24 incarnations of Vishnu ordered by Supreme God)
 Brahm Avtar (incarnation of Brahma)
 Rudar Avtar (incarnation of Shiva)
 Shabad Hazare (ten shabads)
 Swayyae (33 stanzas)
 Khalsa Mehma (the praises of the Khalsa)
 Shaster Nam Mala (a list of weapons)
 Triya Charitar (the character of humans whose fall in deeply and mentally sexual desire )
 Zafarnamah (epistle of victory, a letter written to Emperor Aurangzeb)
 Hikayats (stories)

The following are the main banis regularly recited by devoted amritdhari Sikhs:

 Japji Sahib
 Jaap Sahib
 Tav Prasad Savaiye
 Chaupai Sahib
 Rehiraas Sahib

Sarbloh Granth 

The Sarbloh Granth (Punjabi: ਸਰਬਲੋਹ ਗ੍ਰੰਥ, sarabalŝha grantha) also called Manglacharan Puran, is a voluminous book contains collections of various writings of Guru Gobind Singh, Poets and other Sikhs. Sarbloh Granth literally means "the Granth or Scripture of all-steel or iron". Khalsa Mahima is part of this Granth. This Granth contains hymns of greatness of Panth and Granth. Khalsa Mahima is authentic hymn of Guru Gobind Singh of this granth.

Languages 
 Khadi boli
 Konkani and Marathi
 Punjabi
 Persian
 Hyderabadi
Brij
Influence of Awadhi
Panjabi
Influence of Urdu
Persian
Influence of Arabic

Conservation 

Large amounts of historical Sikh scriptural manuscripts have been systematically "cremated" (burnt to destruction) over the years at secretive ‘Angitha Sahib’ gurdwaras in Punjab and around India under the guise of kar seva. This practice is criticized for systematically destroying historical manuscripts rendering them unable to be researched, archived, repaired, or conserved for future generations.

Digitization of scriptures 
Panjab Digital Library in collaboration with the Nanakshahi Trust took up digitization of Sikh scriptures in 2003. Thousands of manuscripts have been digitized and are available online at Panjab Digital Library.

See also 

 Sant Bhasha
 History of Dasam Granth
 Sikh architecture
 Sikh art and culture
 History of Sikhism
 Gurbani
 Nitnem
 Bhat Vahis

References

External links 

 www.sikhs.org
 Kirtan with English
 Sri Dasam Granth Sahib: Questions and Answers: The book on Sri Dasam Granth Sahib 
 Panjab Digital Library
 Gurbani
 Sri Dasam Granth Report & Contents
 Sri Dasam Granth Sahib ji Website
 Gurudwara.Net Online Guru Granth Sahib with Hindi, Punjabi and English translation.
 www.hrusa.org
 The British Library: Discovering Sacred Texts - Sikhism

 
Sikh terminology